Abronia mitchelli, Mitchell's arboreal alligator lizard, is a species of arboreal alligator lizard in the family Anguidae. The species, which was originally described in 1982 by Jonathan A. Campbell, is endemic to southwestern Mexico.

Etymology
The specific name, mitchelli, is in honor of American herpetologist Lyndon A. Mitchell.

Geographic range
A. mitchelli is found in the Mexican state of Oaxaca.

Habitat

Reproduction
A. mitchelli is viviparous.

References

Further reading
Campbell JA (1982). "A New Species of Abronia (Sauria, Anguidae), from the Sierra Juárez, Oaxaca, México". Herpetologica 38 (3): 355–361. (Abronia mitchelli, new species).
Campbell JA, Frost DR (1993). "Anguid lizards of the genus Abronia: revisionary notes, descriptions of four new species, a phylogenetic analysis, and key". Bulletin of the American Museum of Natural History 216: 1–121.
Mata-Silva J, Johnson JD, Wilson LD, García-Padilla E (2015). "The herpetofauna of Oaxaca, Mexico: composition, physiographic distribution, and conservation status. Mesoamerican Herpetology 2 (1): 6-62. (in English, plus abstract in Spanish).

Abronia
Reptiles described in 1982
Endemic reptiles of Mexico